The New Haven Fire Department (NHFD) provides fire protection and emergency medical services to the city of New Haven, Connecticut. The New Haven Fire Department currently serves a population of over 130,000 people living in 19 square miles of land and is one of the largest fire departments in the state.

The NHFD provides advanced life support and basic life support emergency medical services to the city with three paramedic-staffed Emergency Units. EMS transport services are contracted by the city to American Medical Response which provides response to medical emergencies with Basic Life Support (EMT) and Advanced Life Support (EMT-Paramedic) ambulances.

As of 2016 the NHFD has received an ISO Class 1 rating, making New Haven the third department in Connecticut (the other two being Hartford, CT and Milford, CT) with an ISO Class 1 rating and 1 of 60+/- departments in the country.  James T. Mullen was fire commissioner for 13 years.

Operations

Fire station locations and companies
The New Haven Fire Department currently operates out of 10 fire stations, strategically located throughout the city. The Department is organized into 2 battalions: East Battalion and West Battalion. The NHFD operates with 10 engine companies, 4 truck companies, 1 heavy rescue company, 1 mobile command unit, 1 haz-mat unit, 1 fireground rehabilitation unit, 3 paramedic emergency units, and a fireboat along with several special units. Each engine company and truck company is staffed by an officer and 3 firefighters/EMTs. Rescue 1 is staffed by an officer and 4 firefighters/EMTs. SOC 1 (Special Operations Command 1) is staffed by an officer and 1 firefighter/EMT. Each Emergency (EMS) unit is staffed by 1 firefighter/paramedic and 1 Firefighter/EMT. The haz-mat unit and rehab units are crossed staffed by the officer and firefighter/EMT from SOC 1. Each Battalion Chiefs unit is staffed by a battalion chief. The Deputy Chief serves as the city wide tour commander. Truck 1 is a Tower Ladder Company, Trucks 4 and 2 are Tiller Ladder Companies, and Truck 3 is a Rear Mount Ladder Company.

 this is a listing of all stations and apparatus in front line service operated by the New Haven Fire Department.

Disbanded Fire Companies
Engine 1 - 525 Howard Ave.
Engine 2 - 952 Grand Ave.
Engine 3 - 125 Goffe St. (Closed to form Tactical Unit 1)
Engine 7 - 412 Lombard St. (Closed to form Tactical Unit 2)
Engine 12 - 47 Crown St.
Engine 13 - Never Organized
Engine 14 - 150 Highland St.
Truck 5 - 105 Fountain St.
Truck 6 - 350 Whitney Ave. 
Tactical Unit 1 - 125 Goffe St. (Closed to form Squad 1)
Tactical Unit 2 - 412 Lombard St. (Closed to form Squad 2)
Car 35 (Second/Central Battalion Chief) - 350 Whitney Ave
Squad 1 - 350 Whitney Ave. (Closed in November, 2019 to form Rescue 1, SOC 1, Emergency 3)
Squad 2 - 120 Ellsworth Ave. (Closed in November, 2019 to form Rescue 1, SOC 1, Emergency 3)

Apparatus Manufacturers
Engine 4 - 2012 Pierce Arrow XT 1250gpm./500gal. Pumper
Engine 5 - 2014 Pierce Arrow XT 1500gpm./500gal./500gal. Foam Pumper
Engine 6 - 2016 Pierce Arrow XT 1250gpm./500gal. Pumper
Engine 8 - 2011 Pierce Arrow XT 1250gpm./500gal. Rescue Pumper (Ex-Squad 2)
Engine 9 - 2014 Pierce Arrow XT 1250gpm./500gal. Pumper
Engine 10 - 2018 Seagrave Marauder 1500gpm./750gal. Pumper
Engine 11 - 2014 Pierce Arrow XT 1250gpm./500gal. Pumper
Engine 15 - 2018 Seagrave Marauder 1500gpm./750gal. Pumper
Engine 16 - 2006 Pierce / Kenworth 1000gpm./750gal. Pumper (Ex-Engine 10)
Engine 17 - 2016 Pierce Arrow XT 1250gpm./500gal. Pumper (Ex-Engine 10)
Engine 4A (Spare) - 2000 Pierce Quantum 1250gpm./500gal. Pumper (Ex-Engine 4)
Engine 6A (Spare) - 2003 Pierce Quantum 1250gpm./500gal. Pumper (Ex-Engine 6, Engine 5)
Engine 8A (Spare) - 1998 Pierce Quantum 1250gpm./500gal. Pumper (Ex-Engine 8, Engine 6)
Engine 9A (Spare) - 2000 Pierce Quantum 1250gpm./500gal. Pumper (Ex-Engine 9)
Engine 17A (Spare) - 2007 Pierce Arrow XT 1250gpm./500gal. Pumper.  (Ex- Engine 17)
Truck 1 - 2013 Sutphen SPH 100' Mid-Mount Platform Tower Ladder
Truck 2 - 2008 Seagrave Marauder II 100' Tractor-Drawn Aerial Ladder
Truck 3 - 2010 Pierce Arrow XT 100' Rear-Mount Aerial Ladder
Truck 4 - 2018 Seagrave Marauder II 100' Tractor-Drawn Aerial Ladder
Truck 1A (Spare) - 1996 Sutphen 100' Mid-Mount Platform Tower Ladder (Ex-Truck 1)
Truck 4A (Spare) - 2005 Seagrave Commander II 100' Tractor Drawn Aerial Ladder (Ex-Truck 4)
Rescue 1 - 2018 Seagrave Attacker / Rescue One Heavy Rescue
Squad 1 (Spare) - 2006 Pierce Lance 1250gpm./500gal. Rescue Pumper (Ex-Squad 1)
Car 31 (Chief of Dept) - 2015 Chevrolet Tahoe 
Car 32 (Deputy Chief) - 2012 Chevrolet Tahoe SUV (Ex-Car 39)
Car 32A (Spare/Reserve) - 2004 Chevrolet Tahoe (Ex-Car 32)
Car 33 (East Battalion Chief) - 2011 Ford F-350 Pickup Truck
Car 33A (Spare) - 2003 Chevrolet Suburban 2500 (Ex-Car33)
Car 34 (West Battalion Chief) - 2011 Ford F-350 Pickup Truck
Car 36 (Director of Training) 2016 Chevrolet Traverse 
Car 37 (Fire Marshall) 2016 Chevrolet Traverse
Car 38 (Assistant Chief-Administration) 2021 Chevrolet Suburban
Car 39 (Assistant Chief-Operations) 2016 Chevrolet Tahoe
Car 43 - 1996 Ford Superduty / Shops (Ex-Emergency 4)
Car 44 - 1970 International Harvester / Shops (Ex-Fox 1, Crash 1) 
Car 47 / Brush 1 - 1996 Ford Superduty / Shops (Ex-Emergency 4 / Car 43 (Foam))
Car 50 - 2011 Ford F-350 Pick Up (Ex-Emergency 1)
Car 50A -1986 International (Ex-Tactical Unit 2, Hazmat 1)
Car 51 (Supr of Apparatus) 2015 Chevrolet Silverado 2500HD
Car 52 (Mechanic) 2015 Chevrolet Silverado 2500HD
Car 95 (Supervisor of Fire Investigations)  2015 Chevrolet 2500HD  (Ex-Car 47/Brush 1)
Emergency Unit 1 - 2016 Ford E-350/PL Custom Ambulance
Emergency Unit 2 - 2021 Chevrolet Suburban
Emergency Unit 3 - 2017 Chevrolet Suburban (Ex-Emergency 1A)
EMS 5 - (Supervisor of EMS) 2016 Chevrolet Tahoe
Emergency Unit 1A (Spare) - 2006 Ford Expedition (Ex-EMS 5, Car 36)
Emergency Unit 2A (Spare) - 2011 Ford F-350 Pick Up Truck (Ex-Emergency 1A)
Haz-Mat. Unit 1 - 2007 Sterling Acterra/American LaFrance Medium-Duty Hazmat Unit
Rehab. Unit 1 - 2014 Freightliner M2/2004 ALF Medic Master Ambulance
SOC 1 - 2009 Freightliner M2 Prime Mover (Ex. Car 49, Prime Mover)

Rank structure

Staff Chiefs
Chief Of Department  
Assistant Chief of Administration 
Assistant Chief of Operations

Fire Suppression personnel
Deputy Chief 
Battalion Chief 
Captain
Lieutenant 
Firefighter 1st Grade
Firefighter 2nd Grade
Firefighter 3rd Grade
Probationary Firefighter

Fire Marshals Office personnel
Fire Marshal
Deputy Fire Marshal
Supervisor Of Fire Investigations
Life Safety Compliance Officer
Public Assembly Inspector
Fire Inspector/Investigator

Training Division personnel
Director Of Training/Safety
Drillmaster 
EMS Supervisor
Assistant Drillmaster

Controversy 

In 2009 eighteen city firefighters, seventeen of whom were white and one of whom was Hispanic, brought suit against the department under Title VII of the Civil Rights Act of 1964 after they had passed the test for promotions to management positions and the city declined to promote them. New Haven officials invalidated the test results because none of the black firefighters scored high enough to be considered for the positions. City officials stated that they feared a lawsuit over the test's disproportionate exclusion of certain racial groups from promotion under the controversial "disparate impact" theory of liability.

References

External links
 Official website

Fire departments in Connecticut
Organizations based in New Haven, Connecticut
Government of New Haven, Connecticut
1862 establishments in Connecticut